Alexis Lake is a lake in Chisago County, Minnesota, in the United States.

Alexis Lake was named for John P. Alexis, an early settler.

See also
List of lakes in Minnesota

References

Lakes of Minnesota
Lakes of Chisago County, Minnesota